The Portugal men's national tennis team represents Portugal in Davis Cup tennis competition and is governed by the Federação Portuguesa de Ténis.

Portugal competes in the Europe/Africa Zone Group I in 2017, after being promoted from Group II in the 2015 season. They have never played in the World Group, but reached the World Group Play-offs in 1994 and 2017.

History
Portugal competed in its first Davis Cup in 1925. Their first opponent was Italy, who won 4–1.

Portugal's most successful moment came in 1994 after defeating Great Britain 4–1 in the Group I of the Europe/Africa Zone and qualifying to the World Group play-offs. The team led by João Cunha e Silva, Nuno Marques and Emanuel Couto lost, however, to Croatia 4–0 (the last rubber was abandoned).

Current squad

Player information and rankings

Recent performances
Here is the list of all match-ups since 1981, when the competition started being held in the current World Group format.

1980s

1990s

2000s

2010s

Statistics
Since 1981 (Current through 2017 Davis Cup Europe/Africa Zone Group I Second round)

Record
World Group: 0 times
WG Play-off: 2 time
Europe/Africa Zone Group I: 21 times
Europe/Africa Zone Group II: 11 times

Home and away record (since 1925)
Performance at home (56 match-ups): 32–24 (%)
Performance away (51 match-ups): 13–38 (%)
Total: 45–62 (%)

Head-to-head record (1981–)

 3–0
 3–0
 2–0
 2–0
 2–1
 2–1
 2–1
 2–1
 2–2
 1–0
 1–0
 1–0
 1–0
 1–0
 1–0
 1–0
 1–0
 1–0
 1–1
 1–1
 1–1
 1–1
 1–1
 1–1
 1–1
 1–1
 1–1
 1–2
 1–2
 1–2
 0–1
 0–1
 0–2
 0–4
 0–4
 0–4

Russia record includes two losses against Soviet Union and one loss against CIS.
Serbia and Montenegro record includes two victories against Yugoslavia.

Record against continents

Record by decade
1981–1989: 7–9 (%)
1990–1999: 10–10 (%)
2000–2009: 11–12 (%)
2010–2019: 13–6 (%)

Notes

References

External links

Davis Cup teams
Davis
Tennis in Portugal